Whitefish Lake is a lake in the U.S. state of Minnesota. The lake is approximately one-half mile west of Mille Lacs Lake.

Whitefish is an English translation of the Ojibwe language name.

References

Lakes of Minnesota
Lakes of Crow Wing County, Minnesota
Lakes of Mille Lacs County, Minnesota